Fernando Agustín Giménez Solís (born 10 July 1984) is a Paraguayan footballer who currently plays for Primera División Paraguaya club Deportivo Santaní as an attacking midfielder.

At age nineteen, Giménez joined the Primera División side Nacional Asunción in 2005, and made his professional debut the same season. He spent one season with the Asunción club before moving to Puerto Montt of the Chilean Primera División for an undisclosed fee. In January 2007, he signed a two-season contract with Universidad de Concepción club of the same tier of his old club, which kept him until 2009 at Collao. In his first cycle with his new club, he stayed only six months, because the coach Marcelo Barticciotto did not consider him for the next tournament due to his performance. He was then loaned back to Puerto Montt. Giménez again shone there, being the goal scorer of his team, but it was relegated to Primera B. He returned to Concepción the next season, where he won the 2008 Copa Chile title under coach Jorge Pellicer and recovered his good level of play.

In January 2010, he joined Ecuadorian Serie A powerhouse club Emelec, because the coach Jorge Sampaoli specially requested him. He arrived for a one-season loan with a buy option. He made his debut in the match in which Emelec present their players, an event called Explosión Azul, and scored a goal against Independiente José Terán in a 2–0 home win. As a result of his play on Guayaquil's team, coach Fernando Arce called Giménez to the Paraguay national football team.

International career
Whilst playing at club level in Ecuador for several years, Ecuador's coach, Gustavo Quinteros, requested Giménez's naturalization to play for Ecuador in 2016.

Honours

Club
Universidad de Concepción
 Copa Chile (1): 2008

Emelec
 Ecuadorian Serie A (2): Runner-up 2010, 2011

References

External links
 Giménez at Football–Lineups.com
 
 BDFA profile

1984 births
Living people
Paraguayan footballers
Paraguayan expatriate footballers
Club Nacional footballers
Universidad de Concepción footballers
Puerto Montt footballers
C.S. Emelec footballers
Club Olimpia footballers
Club Libertad footballers
Deportivo Santaní players
Paraguayan Primera División players
Chilean Primera División players
Ecuadorian Serie A players
Expatriate footballers in Chile
Expatriate footballers in Ecuador
Association football midfielders